John Francis Souttar (born 25 September 1996) is a Scottish professional footballer who plays for Scottish Premiership club Rangers and the Scotland national team.  He previously played for Dundee United and Heart of Midlothian before joining Rangers in 2022.

Initially known as a central defender, Souttar was converted to play as a defensive midfielder towards the end of his stay at Dundee United, however he has more recently been deployed as a centre back for Hearts. He is the youngest player to have appeared for Dundee United's first team, having made his debut for the club in January 2013 at the age of 16. After previously representing the country at under-17, under-19 and under-21 levels, he made his full international debut in September 2018.

Early life
Souttar was born in Aberdeen on 25 September 1996 to parents Jack and Heather. His father had previously been a professional footballer, with Brechin City. His mother's side of the family hails from Australia. Growing up in the village of Luthermuir, Aberdeenshire, Souttar attended Luthermuir Primary and then Mearns Academy in nearby Laurencekirk.

In 2002, Souttar began to play for Brechin City Boys Club (later Brechin City Youths), where he was coached by his father in a successful team also containing Ryan Gauld and Euan Spark. The trio also developed their skills at coaching schools run in Dundee by Ian Cathro, before joining Dundee United's youth system in 2006 at the age of nine.

Souttar has a younger brother, Harry, who plays for Leicester City and is an Australian international.

Club career

Dundee United
After progressing through the various youth team levels at Dundee United, Souttar signed a professional contract in July 2012 and became a member of the club's under-20 development squad. After just four months in the development team, injuries and suspensions led to Souttar making his first team debut on 2 January 2013, playing in central defence from the start in a 2–2 draw with Aberdeen at Pittodrie Stadium. Aged 16 years and 99 days, he became the youngest ever player to play for Dundee United. On 24 January 2013, Souttar signed a contract extension keeping him at the club until January 2016. Still aged 16, Souttar returned to the first team in April 2013 following an injury to Brian McLean and started regularly for the remainder of the season, playing against Celtic in a 4–3 Scottish Cup semi-final defeat on 14 April 2013 at Hampden Park.

Souttar's form began to attract the attention of other clubs, with English Premier League team Sunderland having a bid of £600,000 accepted by Dundee United in October 2013. After speaking to Sunderland officials, Souttar decided to turn down the transfer. On 4 November 2013, Souttar signed another extension to his contract, keeping him at Dundee United until May 2016. Souttar continued to play regularly in central defence throughout the 2013–14 season and scored his first goal for the club in a Scottish Premiership match against Aberdeen on 1 January 2014.

Souttar missed the first three months of the 2014–15 season due to an ankle injury sustained in pre-season. After his return to the first team, Dundee United successfully experimented with Souttar in a defensive midfield role in matches against Celtic and Aberdeen during April 2015, a position in which he has subsequently featured regularly. In October 2015, new United head coach Mixu Paatelainen played Souttar at right back in his first two matches in charge. In all he made seventy three appearances in all competitions, scoring twice.

Heart of Midlothian
On 1 February 2016, Souttar signed for fellow Scottish Premiership club Heart of Midlothian, agreeing a three-and-a-half year contract for an undisclosed fee. Speaking about his move Souttar said that he was "looking forward to getting stuck in and getting my career back on track".

Souttar played regularly for Hearts during the 2016–17 season until he suffered a ruptured achilles tendon during a match against Celtic in January 2017 which ended his season. He made a full recovery (though then missed three months in late 2018 with a hip injury which was aggravated on international duty), and took part in the run to the 2019 Scottish Cup Final which Hearts lost to the same opponents.

After missing much of the 2019–20 season with an ankle injury requiring an operation, Souttar returned to the team only to tear the achilles in his other leg during a Scottish Cup tie with Rangers in February 2020. Initially fearing his career was over, the recovery took six months. Due to the COVID-19 pandemic in Scotland, the 2019–20 Scottish league season was curtailed and Hearts were consequently relegated. Soon after returning to training, Souttar snapped the same achilles tendon that had been injured earlier in 2020.

Rangers 
On 14 January 2022, Rangers announced Souttar had signed a pre-contract agreement to bring him to the club at the end of the 2021–22 season once his contract with Hearts runs out. The move was completed on 1 June 2022. He made his debut for the club against Scottish Premiership side Livingston, starting the match, in a 2-1 win on 30 July.

International career
Souttar has represented Scotland at under-17 level, making his debut on 28 August 2012, in a 0–0 draw against Belgium. In May 2013, Souttar made his debut for the Scotland under-19 team, against England.

Alex McLeish called Souttar into the senior Scotland squad for the first time in May 2018, but he was forced to withdraw due to hip and hamstring injuries. In August 2018, Souttar's manager at Hearts, Craig Levein, suggested that Souttar may be called up for Australia if not selected for Scotland. Souttar later admitted he had not considered playing for Australia or been contacted by Football Federation Australia, and that he was unaware Levein was going to make the suggestion.

Souttar was again selected for Scotland in September 2018, and he made his full international debut in a 4–0 defeat against Belgium on 7 September. A month later, in his third appearance, he was sent off for two bookings in a 2–1 loss away to Israel, later stating that he had been suffering with a hip injury (which caused him to miss three months of club football) but chose not to ask to be substituted as his defensive colleague Charlie Mulgrew had already come off injured.

In November 2021 Souttar was called up by Steve Clarke to the Scotland squad for the World Cup qualifiers against Moldova and Denmark. On 15 November 2021 he scored his first international goal, a header from a corner, against Denmark in a 2–0 home win.

Career statistics

Club

International

Honours

Dundee United
 Scottish Cup runner-up: 2013–14
 Scottish League Cup runner-up: 2014–15

Heart of Midlothian
 Scottish Championship: 2020–21
 Scottish Cup runner-up: 2018–19, 2021–22

References

External links
 
 
 

1996 births
Living people
People educated at Mearns Academy
Scottish footballers
Association football central defenders
Association football midfielders
Scotland under-21 international footballers
Scotland youth international footballers
Dundee United F.C. players
Heart of Midlothian F.C. players
Scottish Premier League players
Scottish Professional Football League players
Scotland international footballers
Scottish people of Australian descent
Footballers from Aberdeenshire
Rangers F.C. players